Cytoskeleton regulator RNA is a long non-coding RNA that in humans is encoded by the CYTOR gene.

CYTOR plays a role in breast cancer. It regulates genes involved in the EGFR/mammalian target of rapamycin pathway and is required for cell proliferation, cell migration, and cytoskeleton organization.

References

Further reading